Kilmarnock Rugby Football Club is a Scottish rugby union club which was founded in 1868, and is based in Kilmarnock, Ayrshire in west central Scotland. Often simply referred to as "Killie", their ground is at Bellsland in Kilmarnock, and they were formerly based at Rugby Park (hence its name).

One of the oldest rugby clubs in Scotland, Kilmarnock Football Club owes its existence to KRFC as an internal dispute about which football rules to adopt resulted in a breakaway in early 1869 by those who preferred to play Association Football.

History
When the Scottish National Leagues were introduced in 1973, Killie were placed in the 3rd Division by the Scottish Rugby Union. The club won that season without loss. The following season saw Killie being runners up in Division 2, gaining promotion to the top league. They remained there until 1981 after which a period of promotion and relegation between the 1st and 2nd Divisions was the norm.
In 1978, Killie achieved their highest league position by finishing 3rd in Division 1. In 1986, Killie were the only team to beat Hawick as they swept all aside to win the Championship.

Since the change in league structure to embrace professionalism, Killie have struggled to hold on to their better players and now languish in Division 1 of the West Regional League. It is also likely that Killie took part in the first floodlit rugby match at Rugby Park, now the home of Kilmarnock FC.
There is also a school of thought that South African team Transvaal, now the Golden Lions Super Rugby team, adopted the famous Kilmarnock strip of white top with red hoop as a Kilmarnock member, Alex Frew, captained them when they beat The British Isles touring team in 1903. Frew was also a Scottish Internationalist while attending the University of Edinburgh.

Kilmarnock had a reputation in the 1960s and 1970s of producing top class seven-a-side teams who won many tournaments in west central Scotland. This form was sadly never taken into the Border's Sevens Circuit in the 1970s and 1980s when Killie were a regular feature in all the most prestigious events.

More recent Kilmarnock 1st XV won promotion to RBS NATIONAL 1 for the first time in 20 years after a tough season in 2010–11.

Kilmarnock 2nd XV also known as "the Penguins" have not lost a home game at Bellsland in five seasons. They won the league title 2011–12 having only lost one game away from home. This promotes them into National 2, the second highest level available for 2nd XV teams in Scotland.

Kilmarnock 3rd XV more commonly known as the Killie Polar Bears have won three consecutive league titles 2008–09, 2009–10 and 2010–11 while being managed by John Cairns and Ivor Frater. They have been promoted to the RBS RESERVE LEAGUE WEST POD B making them the only 3rd XV in the division.

Kilmarnock Sevens

The club run the Kilmarnock Sevens competition. The tournament began in 1933.

Notable players
Kilmarnock players to have been capped for  whilst at the club include hooker Andrew Ross and Bill Cuthbertson. Andrew toured with the British Lions in 1924 to South Africa while Bill was part of the 1984 Grand Slam winning team. Bill also played for Barbarian F.C. while at Killie. Other players of note to have played for Killie include;
John (Can) Cairns
Alex Frew
Niven Rose
Hugh McHardy
Ian Blake
  Derek Stark
John Robertson
Derek Martin
Brian Gilbert
Gavin Angus
Hugh Hamilton
Stewart Porter
Scott Grant
Hugh Parker
Dougie Smith
David Gray
Iain Coull
  Bill Cuthbertson

David Gibson, John Stewart and his brother Andrew Stewart all played for Scottish Colleges and Universities. Andrew Stewart was also captain of the Scottish under 18 Team; Andrew, who is now resident in New Zealand, and a professor of Sports Science, has also been involved with the fitness regime of the All Blacks.

Honours
Kilmarnock Sevens
 Champions: 1938, 1946, 1951, 1956, 1957, 1960, 1962, 1966, 1971, 1972, 1974, 1996
Ardrossan Sevens
 Champions: 1956, 1957, 1958, 1959, 1971, 1972, 1995, 1997
Irvine Sevens
 Champions: 1984, 1985
Arran Sevens
 Champions: 1984, 2022
 Hillhead HSFP Sevens
 Champions: 1974, 1975, 1983
 Glasgow University Sevens
 Champions: 1945, 1975, 1981, 1983, 1990, 1991
 Clarkston Sevens
 Champions: 1971, 1972, 1974, 1975, 1978, 1980
 Cumnock Sevens
 Champions: 1972, 1974, 1975
 Hillhead Jordanhill Sevens
 Champions: 1990
 Wigtownshire Sevens
 Champions: 1958, 1965, 1985
 Glasgow Academicals Sevens
 Champions: 1972, 1977
 Allan Glen's Sevens
 Champions: 1980, 1981, 1983
 Ayr Sevens
 Champions: 1939, 1957, 1960, 1975, 1979, 1980, 1983, 1985, 1989
 Stirling Sevens
 Champions: 1960, 1975
 Greenock Sevens
 Champions: 1958, 1971, 1974, 1975,
 Dumfries Sevens
 Champions (1): 2006
 Paisley Sevens
 Champions (1): 2012

Bibliography
 Massie, Allan A Portrait of Scottish Rugby (Polygon, Edinburgh)

References

Scottish rugby union teams
Sport in Kilmarnock
Rugby union in East Ayrshire